These are the teams for the 1980 European Football Championship tournament in Italy, that took place between 11 June and 22 June 1980. The players' listed ages is their actual age on the tournament's opening day (11 June 1980).

Group 1

Czechoslovakia
Manager: Jozef Vengloš

Greece
Manager: Alketas Panagoulias

Netherlands
Manager: Jan Zwartkruis

West Germany
Manager: Jupp Derwall

Group 2

Belgium
Manager: Guy Thys

England
Manager: Ron Greenwood

Italy
Manager: Enzo Bearzot

Spain
Manager: Ladislao Kubala

External links
European Championship 1980 - Final Tournament - Full Details RSSSF.com

Squads
1980